Triammatus subinermis is a species of beetle in the family Cerambycidae. It was described by Stephan von Breuning in 1955. It is known from Borneo.

References

Lamiini
Beetles described in 1955